Public Affairs Committee (PAC) was founded in 1992 by the religious community and other pressure groups in Malaŵi to enter into a dialogue with Kamuzu Banda's Presidential Committee on Dialogue in the transition period from the one-party to the multiparty system of government in Malaŵi. Most accounts of the transition credit PAC with a major role at this crucial point in the younger history of Malaŵi. 

After the referendum on multipartyism was won in 1993 and the first multiparty elections were scheduled to take place in 1994, a number of pressure groups (notably the United Democratic Front and the Alliance for Democracy) split from PAC to form political parties to contest in the elections. PAC has since carried on as an umbrella organisation for the major faith communities represented in the country by the Muslim Association of Malawi, the Quadria Muslim Association of Malawi, the Malawi Council of Churches, the Evangelical Association of Malawi and the Episcopal Conference of Malawi . As such, it is the oldest and most well-known nongovernmental organisation in the country. PAC also is the national chapter of the World Conference on Religion and Peace (WCRP). The organisation’s mission statement is “to mobilise the general public through the religious community and other stakeholders in promoting democracy, development, peace and unity through civic education, mediation and advocacy”. After existing for over a decade, PAC has worked with a large number of partners (both local and international) in pursuance of this mission, and has put into practice a wide variety of activities.

The organisation has a national secretariat in Lilongwe,  Malaŵi's capital city.

References 
 Newell, Jonathan (1995). A Moment of Truth? The Church and Political Change in Malawi, 1992. The Journal of Modern African Studies 33(2): 243-262.
 Ross, Kenneth R. (1995). The Renewal of the State by the Church: the Case of the Public Affairs Committee in Malawi. Religion in Malawi 5: 29-37
 Ross, Kenneth R. (1997). Crisis and Identity: Presbyterian Ecclesiology in Southern Malawi, 1891-1993. Missionalia 25(3): 381-397 (available online)

Religious organisations based in Malawi
Politics of Malawi
Political organisations based in Malawi